Polaris Expeditionary Learning School is an alternative (school of choice) K-12 school in Fort Collins, Colorado (Poudre School District).

Polaris Expeditionary Learning School used to be known as Pioneer, but had to change its name due to district policy and lack of funding to continue as a charter.

Polaris Expeditionary Learning School has an "Adventure Program" that allows students to go on week-long field trips or "Intensives" in order to gain school credit. These Intensives typically happen three times a year. Some students go backpacking for PE credit, while others get elective credit doing beekeeping, cooking, skateboard making, and many other choices, along with active service projects in the community throughout the year.

References 

Education in Fort Collins, Colorado
High schools in Colorado